Johan Mieses (born July 13, 1995) is a Dominican professional baseball outfielder for the Hanshin Tigers of Nippon Professional Baseball (NPB). He signed with the Los Angeles Dodgers as an international free agent in 2013.

Career

Los Angeles Dodgers
On May 31, 2013, Mieses signed with the Los Angeles Dodgers organization as an international free agent. He made his professional debut with the Dominican Summer League Dodgers, hitting .222 in 16 games. In 2014, Mieses returned to the DSL Dodgers, batting .299/.371/.505 with 5 home runs and 24 RBI in 59 games. Mieses split the 2015 season between the Single-A Great Lakes Loons and the High-A Rancho Cucamonga Quakes, accumulating a .260/.309/.439 batting line with 11 home runs and 39 RBI. The following year, Mieses returned to Rancho Cucamonga and hit .247/.314/.510 with career-highs in home runs (28) and RBI (78). In 2017, Mieses split the season between Rancho Cucamonga and the Double-A Tulsa Drillers, posting a .215/.293/.449 slash line with 24 home runs and 63 RBI.

St. Louis Cardinals
On April 1, 2018, the Dodgers traded Mieses to the St. Louis Cardinals in exchange for Breyvic Valera. Mieses split the 2018 season between the High-A Palm Beach Cardinals and the Double-A Springfield Cardinals, posting a .229/.283/.400 slash line with 19 home runs and 71 RBI in 122 games. In 2019, Mieses split the year between the Triple-A Memphis Redbirds and Springfield, slashing .233/.319/.440 with 22 home runs and 66 RBI in 118 games. On November 4, 2019, he elected free agency.

Boston Red Sox
On November 13, 2019, Mieses signed a minor league contract with the Boston Red Sox organization. Mieses did not play in a game in 2020 due to the cancellation of the minor league season because of the COVID-19 pandemic. He was assigned to the Double-A Portland Sea Dogs to begin the 2021 season, and received a promotion to the Triple-A Worcester Red Sox in June. Mieses elected free agency following the season, but was later re-signed to a minor league deal on January 4, 2022. He elected free agency on November 10, 2022.

Hanshin Tigers
On December 15, 2022, Mieses signed with the Hanshin Tigers of Nippon Professional Baseball.

International career
Mieses was named to the Dominican Republic national baseball team for Baseball at the 2020 Summer Olympics, contested in Tokyo in 2021.

References

External links

1995 births
Living people
Sportspeople from Santo Domingo
Dominican Republic baseball players
Baseball outfielders
Baseball players at the 2020 Summer Olympics
Medalists at the 2020 Summer Olympics
Olympic medalists in baseball
Olympic bronze medalists for the Dominican Republic
Dominican Summer League Dodgers players
Great Lakes Loons players
Rancho Cucamonga Quakes players
Tulsa Drillers players
Palm Beach Cardinals players
Springfield Cardinals players
Memphis Redbirds players
Toros del Este players
Portland Sea Dogs players
Worcester Red Sox players
Olympic baseball players of the Dominican Republic